Gloria Buzău may refer to:

 FC Gloria Buzău, a football club currently playing in the Liga II.
 SCM Gloria Buzău (women's handball), a women's handball club in Buzău, Romania
 SCM Gloria Buzău (rugby), a rugby club in Buzău, Romania